Mohamed Sobhy (born 30 August 1981), is an Egyptian footballer who plays for Egyptian Premier League side Ismaily SC as a goalkeeper.

Sobhy was a key member of the Egyptian U20 team which won the third place in the 2001 FIFA World Youth Championship in Argentina. Sobhy was also a member of the Egyptian senior team squad which won and the 2008 Africa Cup of Nations in Ghana.

Honours
Egypt
Africa Cup of Nations: 2008

References

1981 births
Living people
People from Ismailia
People from Ismailia Governorate
Egyptian footballers
Association football goalkeepers
Egypt international footballers
2008 Africa Cup of Nations players
2009 FIFA Confederations Cup players
Egyptian Premier League players
Ismaily SC players
Smouha SC players
Misr Lel Makkasa SC players
El Dakhleya SC players
Egypt youth international footballers